Customs Agent is a 1950 American thriller film directed by Seymour Friedman and starring William Eythe, Marjorie Reynolds and Griff Barnett.

Synopsis
In Shanghai an American customs agent tries to track down a drug-smuggling outfit who killed his predecessor.

Cast
 William Eythe as Bert Stewart 
 Marjorie Reynolds as Lucille Gerrard 
 Griff Barnett as Charles McGraw 
 Howard St. John as Charles Johnson 
 Jim Backus as Shanghai Chief Agent Thomas Jacoby 
 Robert Shayne as West Coast Chief Agent J.G. Goff 
 Denver Pyle as Al

References

Bibliography
 Blottner, Gene. Columbia Noir: A Complete Filmography, 1940-1962. McFarland, 2015.

External links
 

1950 films
1950s thriller films
1950s English-language films
American thriller films
Films directed by Seymour Friedman
Columbia Pictures films
Films set in Shanghai
American black-and-white films
1950s American films
English-language thriller films